Islah is the debut studio album by American rapper Kevin Gates. It was released on January 29, 2016, by Bread Winners' Association and Atlantic Records.

The album was supported by four official singles: "Kno One", "Really Really", "2 Phones" and "Time for That". The album debuted at number two on the US Billboard 200, earning 112,000 album equivalent units in its first week. The album was certified double platinum by the Recording Industry Association of America (RIAA).

Background
In an interview with iHeartRadio, Kevin Gates said:

"I named the album after my daughter because of the anticipation. It was so high. I remember before the birth of my daughter, the anticipation was so high. I was scared, I was excited. I was going through mixed emotions at the time. When people set a high bar because I put out so much good quality music, that bar was so high. I just didn't want to. I was afraid of being a letdown. I was afraid of not being good enough. I was scared to death upon making the album, upon releasing the album. The reason I named my album Islah was because it was my first album. My first real studio album, I guess, so to say. Everything else that I put out was mix tapes. The name Islah means to critique. To make better. A spiritual awakening. When my daughter came, she gave me all of those things. "

Singles
"Kno One" was released via digital download as the album's first single on July 9, 2015. The song was produced by IKENNA FuNkEn and The Featherstones.

"Really Really" was released as the album's lead single (second overall) on October 5, 2015. The song was produced by Alex Goose, Cook Classics and Jake Troth. It peaked at number 46 on the US Billboard Hot 100. To date, the song has been certified double platinum by the Recording Industry Association of America (RIAA).

"2 Phones" was released as the album's third single on November 5, 2015. The song was produced by Mad Max. It became Gates' first top 40 hit single upon the charts, and peaked at number 17 on the Billboard Hot 100. To date, the song has also become certified double platinum by the Recording Industry Association of America (RIAA).

"Time for That" was released as the album's fourth and final single on September 9, 2016. It was produced by Swiff D, alongside additional production from Nick Seeley. The song peaked at number 19 on the US Bubbling Under Hot 100 Singles chart.

Other songs
"La Familia" and "The Truth" were released as instant grats for the album's pre-order simultaneously on September 3, 2015.

Critical reception

Islah received widespread acclaim  from critics. At Metacritic, which assigns a normalized rating out of 100 to reviews from mainstream publications, the album received an average score of 81, based on 10 reviews. In Vice, Robert Christgau said the songs have a variety of moods, catchy melodies, and a strong level of detail from Gates: "Do I like everything he says, much less puts on Instagram? Not close. But his saga is an encouraging, fascinating, educational up. This is a guy who always brings his daughter on tour and thinks affluence is a big day at Bloomingdale's. He's emotional, tender, violent, sensual, fickle, determined, fatalistic, unpredictable, unreliable, hedonistic, and from Louisiana. In a land of 10,000 wannabes, he's an original."

Commercial performance
Islah debuted at number two on the US Billboard 200, earning 112,000 album equivalent units, (including pure album sales of 93,000 copies) in its first week. In its second week, the album fell to number ten on the chart, earning an additional 40,000 units, (including pure album sales of 24,000 copies). In its third week, the album dropped to number eleven, earning 36,000 more units. As of July 2016, the album had sold 305,000 copies in pure album sales. On January 30, 2019, the album was certified double platinum by the Recording Industry Association of America (RIAA) for combined sales and album-equivalent units of over two million units in the United States. Billboard listed Islah at number 171 in a list of the decade's best 200 albums.

Track listing

Notes
  signifies a co-producer
  signifies an additional producer

Personnel
Musicians
 Kevin Gates – vocals
 Jeff Vaughn – background vocals (track 2)
 Holly Seeley – background vocals (6)
 Earl Hood – keyboards (8), programming (8)
 Eric Goudy – keyboards (8)
 David D.A. Doman – drum programming, keyboards (10)
 Jim Stewart – additional guitar, additional keyboards (10)
 Micah Powell – all instruments (16)

Technical
 Chris Athens – mastering
 Joe Fitz – mixing (1, 3, 5, 7, 8, 14, 15, 17)
 Jaycen Joshua – mixing (2, 6, 9, 12, 16)
 Dan Weston – mixing (4, 10, 13)
 Millz – mixing (11), engineering (2, 4–6, 10–15, 17)
 Courtney Horton – mix engineering (5), mixing assistance (3, 7–9, 14, 15, 17)
 Brandon Thomas – engineering (1, 3, 6, 9, 15)
 Joshra Collins – engineering (1, 3, 16)
 Alex Toval – engineering (2)
 John Schullman – engineering (2)
 Thurston McCrea – engineering (5, 8)
 Christian Garcia – engineering (7)
 Kenneth "KP" Pruitt – engineering (16)
 Maddox Chimm – mixing assistance (2)
 Ryan Kaul – mixing assistance (2)
 Jeff Vaughn – engineering assistance (2, 3, 6, 7, 12)

Charts

Weekly charts

Year-end charts

Decade-end charts

References

2016 debut albums
Kevin Gates albums